NMU may refer to:

Education
 Northern Michigan University, a public university in Marquette, Michigan
 Nelson Mandela University, a public university in Port Elizabeth, South Africa
 National Mining University of Ukraine
 Nishtar Medical University
 North Maharashtra University, Maharashtra, India

Miscellaneous
 National Maritime Union
 N-Nitroso-N-methylurea